Adanjur A.Singaravel Viruthullar (1898-1960) was an Indian Congress Party leader and an agriculturist from the erstwhile Madras presidency.

Political career 
Adanjur A.Singaravel Viruthullar became interested in politics via his aide P. S. Sivaswami Iyer and continued his political career as the Executive incharge of the Tanjore District Congress committee. He was twice elected to Tanjore district board (1949 - 1959).

Charity 
Viruthullar made significant contributions to charity in the Cavery delta. He donated a 12 km asphalt road for public use and gave 50+ acres of cultivation land for the welfare of the Dalit community. He constructed Adanjur Mariamman temple.

Personal life 
Viruthullar was born to a rich landlord Adanjur N.Arumugam Viruthullar in Adanjur village near Thirukattupalli, Tanjore in 1898. He married his relative Kathammal. Viruthullar was the first in his village to get proper education. He died at age 62 on 1960 at Adanjur. He had four sons and two daughters. His elder son Sundararaj Viruthullar is well known for his service towards temple and spiritual activities. His younger son Rajappa served as an Executive officer in Tamilnadu HR & CE department. In his tenure, he made Consecrated (Kumbabhishekam) for several temples including Lord Brahadeeswara temple, Tanjore and Sri Garbarakshambika temple Thirukarukaavoor.

References 

Indian National Congress politicians from Tamil Nadu
People from Thanjavur district
1898 births
1960 deaths